Hsu Hung-cheng (born 1 August 1941) is a Taiwanese boxer. He competed in the men's featherweight event at the 1964 Summer Olympics.

References

1941 births
Living people
Taiwanese male boxers
Olympic boxers of Taiwan
Boxers at the 1964 Summer Olympics
Place of birth missing (living people)
Featherweight boxers
20th-century Taiwanese people